Dash Bolagh-e Olya (also Romanized as Dāsh Bolāgh-e ‘Olyā; also known as Dāsh Bolāghī-ye ‘Olyā) is a village in Charuymaq-e Jonubegharbi Rural District, in the Central District of Charuymaq County, East Azerbaijan Province, Iran. At the 2006 census, its population was 66, in 11 families.

References 

Populated places in Charuymaq County